Greenland has competed in the European Championships since the second event in 2022.

Medal count

See also
Sport in Greenland

References

Greenland at multi-sport events